William K. Pattinson (born 31 March 1945), also known as Billy Pattinson, is an English former professional rugby league footballer who played in the 1960s and 1970s.

Background
Bill Pattinson's birth was registered in Cockermouth, Cumberland, England.

Playing career

International honours
Bill Pattinson won a cap for England (Under-24s) while at Workington Town in the 4–7 defeat by France (Under-24s) at Stade Jean Dauger, Bayonne, France on Saturday 26 November 1966.

County honours
Bill Pattinson won 6-caps for Cumberland while at Workington Town, including a 17–15 victory over Australia at Derwent Park, Workington on Saturday 18 November 1967.

Challenge Cup Final appearances
Bill Pattinson played right-, i.e. number 12, in Bradford Northern's 14–33 defeat by Featherstone Rovers in the 1973 Challenge Cup Final during the 1972–73 season at Wembley Stadium, London on Saturday 12 May 1973, in front of a crowd of 72,395.

County Cup Final appearances
Bill Pattinson played  in Swinton's 11–25 defeat by Salford in the 1972 Lancashire County Cup Final during the 1972–73 season at Wilderspool, Warrington on Saturday 21 October 1972.

Player's №6 Trophy Final appearances
Bill Pattinson played  in Bradford Northern's 3–2 victory over Widnes in the 1974–75 Player's No.6 Trophy Final during the 1974–75 season at Wilderspool, Warrington on Saturday 25 January 1975.

Club career
Bill Pattinson was transferred from Risehow ARLFC to Workington Town during May 1965, he made his début for Workington Town in the 8–10 defeat by Salford at Derwent Park, Workington on Saturday 11 December 1965, he played his last match for Workington Town in the 11–31 defeat by St. Helens at Knowsley Road, St. Helens on Saturday 23 August 1969, he was transferred from Workington Town to Warrington between 23 August 1969 and 29 August 1969, he made his début for Warrington in the 14–7 victory over St. Helens at Derwent Park, Workington on Friday 29 August 1969, he played alongside Bob Fulton during the 1969–70 season, he played his last match for Warrington in the 8–36 defeat by St. Helens at Knowsley Road, St. Helens on Saturday 18 April 1970, he was transferred from Warrington to Swinton, he made his début for Swinton, and scored 2-tries in the 22–7 victory over Hull F.C. at Station Road, Swinton on Saturday 22 August 1970, he was transferred from Swinton to Bradford Northern during January 1973, he made his début for Bradford Northern in the 17–4 victory over Whitehaven at Odsal Stadium, Bradford on Saturday 27 January 1973, he was part of the squad that won the Championship Second Division during the 1973–74 season, he was transferred from Bradford Northern to Swinton, he played his last match for Swinton in the 23–14 victory over York at Station Road, Swinton on Sunday 24 April 1977, after which he retired from rugby league.

Genealogical information
Bill Pattinson is the uncle of the rugby league footballer who played in the 1970s for Blackpool Borough (37-appearances, including the 15–25 defeat by Castleford in the Player's No.6 Trophy League Cup Final at The Willows, Salford on Saturday 22 January 1977) and Workington Town (1-appearance); Malcolm Pattinson, the rugby league footballer who played in the 1970s for Workington Town (12-appearances); Stanley "Stan" Pattinson, the rugby league footballer who played in the 1970s and 1980s for Workington Town (112-appearances from 1979 to 1985); Robert "Bobby" Pattinson, the rugby league footballer; Bill Pattinson, and Harold Pattinson. Despite having a playing career that partially overlapped those of his nephews, Bill Pattinson never played alongside his nephews.

Note
Bill Pattinson's first-team début for Workington Town's is stated as being against Liverpool City on Saturday 3 April 1965 in the 'Cumberland Rugby League: 100 Greats' reference, but this match is stated as being against Liverpool City A-Team, with Bill Pattinson having no first-team appearances during the 1964–65 season in the 'Workington Town Hall of Fame' reference.

References

External links
(archived by web.archive.org) Workington Town » Legends Evening 80's
Photograph 'Roy Castle meets the players – The players meet Roy Castle prior to the Final. – 11/05/1973' at rlhp.co.uk
Photograph 'The National Anthem – The team lines up for the National Anthem. – 12/05/1973' at rlhp.co.uk
Photograph 'Pattinson scores – Bill Pattinson scores in the big win v. Blackpool – 01/01/1974' at rlhp.co.uk
Photograph 'Marching orders – Referee Campbell gives Blakeway his marching orders. – 06/01/1974' at rlhp.co.uk
Photograph 'Daylight training – Daylight training before the 3rd Round Cup game v. Featherstone. – 08/03/1974' at rlhp.co.uk
Photograph 'Bill Pattinson – Bill Pattinson who quietly gets through a lot of work. – 14/04/1974' at rlhp.co.uk
Photograph 'Bill Pattinson breaks through – Bill Pattinson breaks through one tackle on his way to a try. – 01/09/1974' at rlhp.co.uk
Photograph 'Ramsey leads the players off – Rival skippers Ramsey and Senior lead their players off after todays cup tie. – 01/09/1974' at rlhp.co.uk

1945 births
Living people
Bradford Bulls players
Cumberland rugby league team players
English rugby league players
Rugby league locks
Rugby league players from Cockermouth
Rugby league second-rows
Swinton Lions players
Warrington Wolves players
Workington Town players